Dead to Rights is a neo-noir video game series focusing on Jack Slate, a police officer in the fictional Grant City, and his K-9 partner Shadow. There are four games in the series.

Games

Dead to Rights 

Dead to Rights, the first game in the series, was developed by Namco and released as a timed exclusive for the Xbox in 2002. Releases for the PlayStation 2 and GameCube followed thereafter, and the game was ported to Microsoft Windows a year later.

The game focuses on Jack Slate, a police officer partnered with his dog Shadow. The two patrol Grant City, a metropolis seemingly populated with more criminals than honest citizens. One night while on a routine patrol, Jack responds to a call at a construction zone, only to find his own father murdered. In pursuit of his father's killer, Jack is led through a labyrinth of crime and corruption.

Dead to Rights II 

Dead to Rights II, the second game in the series, is a prequel to the first game, developed by Widescreen Games and released for Microsoft Windows, Xbox, and PlayStation 2. The game retains many of the original game's gameplay elements. It focuses on Jack and Shadow searching for a reputable judge and a kidnapped friend of Jack's father.

Dead to Rights: Reckoning 

Dead to Rights: Reckoning, the third game in the series, was developed by Rebellion Developments and was released for the PlayStation Portable. It serves as a prequel to Dead to Rights II, making it chronologically the earliest in the series. It focuses on Jack Slate rescuing the kidnapped daughter of a Grant City official.

Dead to Rights: Retribution 

Dead to Rights: Retribution is a reboot of the series and the fourth installment overall, focusing on vice officer Jack Slate and his canine companion Shadow exposing criminal elements in the crumbling metropolis of Grant City. For the first time in the series, players can fight as Shadow.

References 

Third-person shooters
Video game franchises
Namco games
Bandai Namco games
Bandai Namco Entertainment franchises
Organized crime video games
Neo-noir video games
Video games about police officers
Video game franchises introduced in 2002